Pornography: A Thriller is a 2009 American mystery/thriller film, written and directed by David Kittredge.

Pornography: A Thriller is a non-linear story in three parts, all revolving around the disappearance of fictional adult gay film actor Mark Anton (Jared Grey). The first act depicts Anton's final days in 1995, the second is about writer Michael Castigan (Matthew Montgomery) as he searches for the truth in 2009 about what happened to Anton, and the third revolves around 2009 adult film actor Matt Stevens's (Pete Scherer) attempt to make The Mark Anton Story, based in part on his dreams of what happened to Anton.

The film uses an unconventional structure, with actors playing multiple roles in different sections, and uses dream logic to tell its story through a subjective point of view. Because of this, it has been compared to the work of David Lynch (most notably Lost Highway and Mulholland Drive) and David Cronenberg (notably Videodrome).

Kittredge says about the structure, "We wanted to replicate the dream logic of a nightmare. So even though we don’t spell everything out for the audience, the film is still a complete whole and has its own fully formed arc that’s hopefully a satisfying whole."

Cast
 Matthew Montgomery as Michael Castigan
 Pete Scherer as Matt Stevens
 Jared Grey as Mark Anton
 Walter Delmar as William/Jason
 Dylan Vox as Jason Steele
 Steve Callahan as Jerome
 Akie Kotabe as Jeremy/Adam
 Wyatt Fenner as Student/Angel
 Larry Weissman as Harry
 Jon Gale as Rex
 Nick Salamone as Billy
 Bret Wolfe as Bishop Scott

Production
The film was shot in 16 days for under $200,000. And although much of the film takes place in New York City and Brooklyn, it was mostly shot in and around Los Angeles.

The film was shot primarily with Panasonic HVX200 cameras. One was outfitted with a PS Technik adapter, which gave the image a filmic depth of field and grain that emulated 16mm. There were a variety of other cameras used as well in different parts (mostly in a "practical" fashion, denoting footage that was shot in the story of the film), including the Panasonic DVX100a, a Sony Handycam, and an 80s-era Sony Video 8 camcorder (featured prominently in the film).

The 5.1 sound mix was done by Sonicpool in Hollywood and the HD color-correct and finishing was done at Postworks, New York.

Release
Pornography: A Thriller premiered at Newfest: the New York LGBT Film Festival in June 2009. It played at over 25 film festivals around the world, including Outfest, Frameline, Philadelphia QFest, and Reeling Chicago.

The film was theatrically released in the US on April 13, 2010, at the Cinema Village in New York City. The film was released theatrically in Germany by Bildkraft on July 9, 2010, and the UK by Peccadillo Pictures on August 27.

The film was released on DVD and iTunes in the United States by Wolfe Video July 13, 2010. The DVD features ten deleted or extended scenes, a commentary track featuring writer/director David Kittredge, producer Sean Abley and actors Matthew Montgomery, Pete Scherer and Jared Grey, and a behind-the-scenes featurette called "Smile For the Camera".

Digitally, the film was released in the United States on DVD and iTunes on August 30, 2010. The film was released on DVD in France by Optimale on August 31, 2010. Peccadillo Pictures also launched an aggressive online campaign for the film in the guise of a fake "snuff film" website, based on the plot points about a mysterious videotape and symbol; the site featured recut snippets of the film and spread virally.

The world television premiere on Logo Network was October 31, 2010.

Critical response
Pornography was very well received at several film festivals, and won awards at two.

Critics had polarized responses. "Kind of pretentious.... Kind of amazing, too," was the summation in New York's L Magazine., who also named it "The Citizen Kane of Gay Porn Ghost Stories".  Reverse Shot lauded the "well placed" plot twists and "nicely paced" mystery, saying that it was "impressively committed to its own vision and logic". The Village Voice called it "Ambitiously layered" and "Unabashedly arty and impressively shot". Chuck Wilson of LA Weekly called the film "a crazily ambitious debut thriller" and "Pornography marks Kittredge as filmmaker with a strong mind and a gift for drawing full-bodied performances from his actors". Tirdad Derakhshani of The Philadelphia Inquirer named it "a deeply affecting and disturbing thriller that has earned Kittredge comparisons to David Lynch and David Cronenberg." Matthew Sorrento's positive review in Film Threat states "When handled well, dread can extend far beyond our conscious need for order – Lovecraft himself held that our fear is strongest when we fear the unknown. Pornography approaches this conceit without the timidity of lesser efforts." He ends with "I recommend all fans of the bizarre have a look."

Awards

Festivals
2009
Newfest: the New York LGBT Film Festival (World Premiere)
Frameline: the San Francisco LGBT Film Festival
Outfest: the Los Angeles LGBT Film Festival
QFest: the Philadelphia LGBT Film Festival (centerpiece selection)
"Best of NewFest" @ BAM
Out on Film: the Atlanta LGBT Film Festival (closing night)
Cinema Diverse: The Gay and Lesbian Film Festival of Palm Springs
Tampa International LGBT Film Festival
Reel Affirmations: the Washington DC LGBT Film Festival
Atlantic Film Festival, Halifax, Nova Scotia
Portland LGBT Film Festival
OutTakes Dallas (closing night)
Reeling: the Chicago LGBT Film Festival
Fresno Reel Pride: Night Out Film Festival
image+nation: Montreal LGBT Film Festival
Long Island LGBT Film Festival (opening night)

2010
Reelout Queer Film & Video Festival, Kingston, Ontario
Brussels LGBT Film Festival
Mardi Gras Film Festival, Sydney, Australia
Miami LGBT Film Festival (special screening, Feb 21)
Melbourne Queer Film Festival
Brisbane Queer Film Festival
FilmOut San Diego (centerpiece selection)
Seoul LGBT Film Festival (centerpiece selection)
ColognePride, Cologne, Germany
Vancouver LGBT Film Festival

References

External links

2009 films
2000s erotic thriller films
American LGBT-related films
American erotic thriller films
Films about gay male pornography
Films about pornography
Films about filmmaking
Self-reflexive films
2009 directorial debut films
2000s English-language films
2000s American films
Gay-related films